Shadow Fighter (hangul:섀도우 파이터, Shaedou Paiteo) is a Korean animation. It is a product of the major anime broadcaster Munhwa Broadcasting Corporation, and the 3D animation was done by Yellow Film. The story centers on the fighter character, a war and robot fight squirrel.

Characters
Cay(K)
Aqua
Luke
Komangsong
Ranbi
Shark
Donk
Eagle
Mata
Chianka

Voice actors
Cay(K)-Sohn Jeong Ah
Aqua-Woo Jeong Shin
Ranbi-Bak So Ra
Luke-Kim Ah Young
Komangsong-Kim Seo Young
Eagle-Choi Han
Shark-Kim Youngsun
Donk-Choi Seok Phil
Mata-Rhee Seon
Chianka-Kim Yong Joon

External links
MBC Shadow Fighter Homepage
MBC Manhwa Madang Homepage
Shadow Fighter at Mimanbu (Korean)

South Korean animation